Campaea is a genus of moths in the family Geometridae first described by Jean-Baptiste Lamarck in 1816.

Species
Based on Species 2000 and ITIS Catalogue of Life:
 Campaea adsociaria
 Campaea approximata
 Campaea biseriata
 Campaea bupleuraria
 Campaea clausa
 Campaea decoraria
 Campaea dehaliaria
 Campaea dulcinaria
 Campaea excisaria
 Campaea haliaria
 Campaea honoraria (Denis & Schiffermüller, 1775) – embellished thorn
 Campaea honorifica
 Campaea ilicaria
 Campaea margaritata (Linnaeus, 1767) – light emerald
 Campaea olivata
 Campaea parallela
 Campaea perlaria
 Campaea perlata (Guenée, 1857) – pale beauty
 Campaea pictarorum
 Campaea praegrandaria
 Campaea reisseri
 Campaea rubrociliata
 Campaea sesquistriataria
 Campaea similaria
 Campaea triangularis
 Campaea vernaria
 Campaea virescens
 Campaea viridoperlata
 Campaea vitriolata
 Campaea zawiszae

Gallery

References

Campaeini